The 2009–10 PBA Philippine Cup Finals was the championship basketball best-of-7 series of the 2009–10 PBA Philippine Cup, and the conclusion of the conference's playoffs. The Alaska Aces and the Purefoods Tender Juicy Giants played for the 98th championship contested by the league.

The two franchises were in their seventh Finals match-up, with both teams splitting the six Finals series winning three each.  However, Purefoods swept Alaska 4–0 to win their eighth PBA title, and only the third best-of-seven sweep in league history. James Yap was named Best Player of the Conference and Finals MVP.

Background

Purefoods Tender Juicy Giants
The Giants finished third in the elimination round, outlasted the Rain or Shine Elasto Painters in the quarterfinals in five games, and defeated the #2 seed and sister team San Miguel Beermen in six games after trailing the series 1–2.

Alaska Aces
The Aces qualified after beating the Barangay Ginebra Kings in the semifinals via a 4–0 sweep; they previously qualified to the semifinals after posting the best record after the elimination round.

Road to the finals

Series summary

Game 1

The first half was contested tightly, Alaska led 19–15 after the first, then the two teams ending up tied at halftime. Purefoods star players James Yap and Kerby Raymundo had to sit the majority of the third quarter due to foul trouble, but the Giants only trailed by three after the third period. In the fourth quarter, Purefoods had an early surge to put them up by seven; Alaska cut the lead and tied the game midway the quarter at 72–all off a Reynel Hugnatan lay-up. Rafi Reavis scored all of his six points in the succeeding possessions to put the Giants up 78–74, then he blocked Willie Miller's shot at the other end. Roger Yap missed a jumpshot, but Reavis scored in a tip-in to put Purefoods up by six. Miller scored a three-pointer to cut the lead by three with eleven seconds left, but Niño Canaleta split his free throws to put Purefoods up for good.

Game 2

Purefoods had a good first half, racing to a nine-point lead at halftime, with Reavis scoring 13 of his 17 points during the first half. The Aces stormed back in the third quarter, leading 62–57, then padding their lead to 14 with five minutes left in the final period, capped off by a Brandon Cablay three-pointer. James Yap then spearheaded a 19–6 run to take over the game; Yap scored two consecutive three-pointers to cut Alaska's lead to six, 78–72. Raymundo also scored his own three-pointer during the run, while LA Tenorio maintained Alaska's 82–76 six-point lead with a jumper. James Yap converted both of his free throws to give Purefoods their first taste of the lead with 14 seconds left. Joe Devance was fouled and split his free throws to tie the game at 85–all. In the ensuing play, referee Raymundo Maurillo called a foul on Devance that elicited furious protests from Alaska head coach Tim Cone and team manager Joaqui Trillo. With 1.7 seconds left, Raymundo converted the first, and intentionally missed the second, leading to a long rebound as time expired.

Alaska team owner Wilfred Steven Uytengsu sent a text message to league commissioner Sonny Barrios, saying "I cannot condone Talk 'N Text's walkout (in the semifinals), but I can certainly feel their pain and point of view after that last call. It was most disappointing."

While the game was ongoing, an Alaska fan suffered a heart attack with under two minutes left that caused the game to be delayed momentarily. After the game, Trillo said they won't protest the result of the game.

Game 3

The Aces erected a 13-point lead midway the third quarter, but Purefoods had a fourth quarter rally to close the gap. Niño Canaleta opened the fourth quarter with a slam dunk and a three pointer to cut the lead to three points; John Ferriols and Tony dela Cruz both converted jump shots to add Alaska lead but Purefoods then scored the next seven points to tie game. Miller beat the 24-second shot clock with a jumper to put Alaska up by three, but then Canaleta scored on a three-point shot to tie the game anew; then Canaleta missed a hurried three-pointer with Purefoods now leading by a point. Joe Devance missed a forced shot, and Miller's drive to basket was well-contested leading to another miss as Purefoods held on to take a 3–0 lead.

Game 4

Prior to the game, James Yap was awarded his first Best Player of the Philippine Cup award.

Purefoods raced to two 13-point leads in the third period, but Alaska had a 10–0 run, with LA Tenorio scoring seven points to tie the score with 2.1 seconds left at the second quarter. With seven minutes left in the third quarter, Purefoods had their own 9–0 run to lead 57–48. Alaska managed to cut the lead to three, but Purefoods replied with their own with a 9–2 run to lead by 12 points with 4:27 left in the game. Purefoods will not relinquish the lead, and they won their seventh consecutive game since game 4 of the semifinals to clinch the championship.

Awards
Philippine Cup holders: Purefoods Tender Juicy Giants
Finals MVP: James Yap
Best Player of the Conference James Yap

Rosters

Broadcast notes

References

External links
PBA official website

2010
2009–10 PBA season
Alaska Aces (PBA) games
Magnolia Hotshots games
PBA Philippine Cup Finals
PBA Philippine Cup Finals